The Pearcey Awards are a set of prizes presented annually since 1998 by the Pearcey Foundation for achievement in the Australian ICT industry.

Pearcey Award Categories
Each year, the Pearcey Foundation presents 3 categories of award:

Pearcey Medal The Pearcey Medal is awarded annually to the individual who has made the greatest lifetime achievement and contribution to the ICT profession and industry in Australia.

Pearcey Hall of Fame In addition to the Pearcey Medal winner, up to two individuals are inducted into the Pearcey Hall of Fame, based on their lifetime contribution to the Australian ICT industry.

State Pearcey Awards Each state presents a Pearcey award to an upcoming individual who contributes an innovative or pioneering achievement to research and development within the ICT industry.

Pearcey Medal Winners
2021 David Thodey
2020 Professor Jennifer Seberry
2019 Professor David Abramson
2018 Dr Dennis Cooper
2017 Mike Miller
2016 Steve Baxter
2015 David Merson
2014 Mary O'Kane
2013 Alex Zelinsky
2012 Mal Bryce
2011 Brand Hoff
2010 John Grant 
2009 Murray Allen
2008 Neville Roach
2007 Roger Allen
2006 Fiona Balfour
2005 John O'Callaghan
2004 John Bennett
2003 Lyndsey Cattermole
2002 Bill Caelli
2001 Tony Benson
2000 George Kepper
1999 Trevor Robinson
1998 Peter Jones

Pearcey Hall of Fame Inductees
2021 Judith Hammond, Alan Noble
2020 Jeff Whittle AO, Owen Hill
2019 Sonja Bernhardt OAM, Bob Beaumont
2018 Emeritus Professor Robin Stanton, Dr Reg Coutts
2017 Kate Lundy, Helen Meredith
2016 Jim Ellis OAM, Robin Eckermann AM
2015 Geoff Huston AM, Adrian Di Marco
2014 Peter Vogel, Dr Bob Frater AO
2013 Robert Elz, Dr Rod Tucker
2012 Dr Mal Bryce, Dr Craig Mudge AO
2011 Dr Ann Moffatt, Dr Dennis Moore
2010 Brian Finn AO, Emeritus Professor Peter Poole
2009 Harry Wragge, Dr Barry Thornton
2008 Clive Finkelstein, Neil Weste
2007 Rob Newman, John Puttick
2006 Cyril Brookes, Max Burnet
2005 Ashley Goldsworthy, John O'Neil
2004 Ormonde Browne, Bob Bishop, Renfrey Potts
2003 John O'Callaghan, David Hartley
2002 Robert Northcote, Phil Singleton
2001 John Bennett, Frank Hirst

State Pearcey Awards

Australian Capital Territory
2021 Daniel Shaddock
2020 Shane Hill
2019 Matthew Wilson
2018 Ken Kroeger
2017 Phillip Williamson and Mark Riley
2016 Dean Spaccavento
2015 Greg Boorer
2013/14 John de Margheriti
2012 Dr Vikram Sharma
2011 Matt Bullock
2010 Dr Raymond Choo
2009 Michael McGoogan
2008 Mathew Purcell

New South Wales
2021 Jordan O'Reilly and Laura O'Reilly OAM
2020 Jamila Gordon
2019 Ashik Ahmed
2018 Nick Molnar
2017 Tim Fung and Jonathan Lui
2016 Richard White
2015 Melanie Perkins
2014 Ben Richardson, Dave Greiner and Tim Power
2013 Simon Clausen and Naomi Simson
2012 Mitch Harper, Eddie Machaalani and Jo Burston
2011 Simon Poole and Steve Frisken
2010 Lars and Jens Rasmussen 
2009 Ian Gardiner
2008 Mike Cannon-Brookes, Scott Farquhar
2007 Jeff Waugh, Pia Waugh
2006 Matt Barrie
2005 James Dalziel
2004 Hugh Durrant-Whyte
2003 Ted Dunstone
2002 Alex Hartman
2001 Derek Renouf
2000 Clinton Paddison
1999 Scott Gazzard

Queensland
2021 Michael Holmstrom
2020 Nick Therkelsen-Terry
2019 Tim Neale
2018 Peter Laurie 
2017 Jenine Beekhuyzen OAM
2016 Aaron Birkby
2015 Wayne Gerard
2007 Tammy Halter
2006 Brett Hooker
2005 Kon Kakanis
2004 Adrian Di Marco
2003 David Barbagallo

South Australia
2021 Mohan Koo
2020 Dr Michelle Perugini
2018 Tony Clark
2017 Geoff Rohrsheim
2016 Steward Bartlett
2014 Dr Henry Detmold
2013 Dr Alex Grant
2011 Matthew Michalewicz 
2010 Dr Anton van den Hengel 
2004 Ross Williams
2003 Simon Ronald
2002 Jonathan Baxter

Tasmania
2021 Nina McMahon
2020 Mike Cruse 
2018 Dr Gary McDarby
2015 James Riggall
2014 James Cuda
2013 Lawrence Howson
2012 Jared Hill
2011 Daniel Harrison
2010 Paris Buttfield-Addison, Jon Manning
2006 Ian Cumming
2005 Luke Bereznicki
2004 Chris Dalton, Anthony Scotney (joint winners)

Victoria
2021 Bronwyn Le Grice
2020 Grant Petty
2019 Craig McDonald
2018 Bernie Tschirren and Michael Cameron
2017 Cyan and Collis Ta'eed
2016 Martin Hosking
2015 Alison Hardacre
2014 Bevan Clark and Guy King
2013 Leni Mayo
2012 Oliver Roydhouse
2011 Dr Elaine Saunders
2010 Brett Paterson
2009 Robert Murray
2008 Michael Giuffrida
2007 Ashley Herring
2006 Anthony Overmars
2005 Graeme Huon
2004 Luke Howard
2003 Alec Umansky
2002 Jonathan Zufi
2001 Anna Carosa
2000 Rick Harvey
1999 Michael Kölling

Western Australia
2021 Charlie Gunningham
2020 Greg Riebe
2019 Rob Nathan
2018 Dr Mark Andrich
2017 Matthew Macfarlane

References

External links
Pearcey Foundation website

Australian science and technology awards